The men's team pursuit in the 2012–13 ISU Speed Skating World Cup was contested over four races on four occasions, out of a total of nine World Cup occasions for the season, with the first occasion taking place in Heerenveen, Netherlands, on 16–18 November 2012, and the final occasion also taking place in Heerenveen on 8–10 March 2013.

The Netherlands successfully defended their title from the previous season, while South Korea came second and Russia came third.

Top three

Race medallists

Standings 
''Standings as of 10 March 2013 (end of the season).

References 

Men team pursuit